Baird's beaked whale (Berardius bairdii), also known as the northern giant bottlenose whale, North Pacific bottlenose whale, giant four-toothed whale, northern four-toothed whale and the North Pacific four-toothed whale, is a species of whale from the genus Berardius. Baird's and Arnoux's beaked whales are so similar that researchers have debated whether or not they are simply two populations of the same species. However, genetic evidence and their wide geographical separation has led them to be classified as separate. Baird's beaked whale is the second largest living species of toothed whale after the sperm whale.

Taxonomy
Baird's beaked whales were first described in 1883 by American zoologist Leonhard Stejneger based on a skull from a specimen that had been found stranded on the eastern shore of Bering Island the previous fall. The species was named after Spencer Fullerton Baird, the then Secretary of the Smithsonian. A few months after Stejneger's description was published, Swedish zoologist August Wilhelm Malm published a description of a new species in the Beradius genus, Beradius vegae, based on a portion of a skull found on Bering Island in 1879. Beradius vegae was later determined to be a junior synonym of Beradius bairdii.

Description 
The snout, called a beak, is elongated and lacks all teeth except for one or two sets in the lower mandible, which are called "battle teeth" for their use in intra-species conflict. Individuals often bear scars from such confrontations.

Baird's beaked whale can live for up to 84 years.

Distribution
The species occurs the North Pacific Ocean and the Japan, Okhotsk, and Bering Seas. It is a deep-water species, primarily frequenting depths between 1,000 m and 3,000 m.

References

Ziphiids
Taxa named by Leonhard Stejneger
Taxa described in 1883
Mammals described in 1883